Oh Happy Day is an album by organist Don Patterson recorded in 1969 and released on the Prestige label. The CD is titled Dem New York Dues combined with another Patterson session

Reception

Allmusic awarded the album 2 stars.

Track listing 
All compositions by Don Patterson except as noted
 "Oh Happy Day" (Edwin Hawkins) - 7:18  
 "Perdido" (Juan Tizol) - 8:48  
 "Good Time Theme" - 3:40  
 "Hip Trip" - 13:38  
 "Blue 'n' Boogie" (Dizzy Gillespie, Frank Paparelli) - 4:43

Personnel 
Don Patterson - organ
Virgil Jones - trumpet
Houston Person - tenor saxophone
George Coleman - tenor saxophone (tracks 2, 4 & 5)
Pat Martino - guitar
Frankie Jones - drums

References 

Don Patterson (organist) albums
1969 albums
Prestige Records albums
Albums produced by Bob Porter (record producer)
Albums recorded at Van Gelder Studio